Ebbs is a municipality in the Kufstein district of Tyrol in Austria. The village is located in the Judicial district of Kufstein and in 2016 had a population of 5,480.

Geography 
Ebbs is located in the Lower Inn Valley near Kufstein, to the east of the Inn river at the foot of the Kaiser Mountains. Ebbs is ranked among the largest municipalities in the Kufstein district and one of the largest villages in Tyrol. At 475 m above sea level, it is also the lowest village in Tyrol. The Inn forms the border to Bavaria.

References

External links
 Official website

Cities and towns in Kufstein District